The 2014 Israeli Beach Soccer League was a national beach soccer league that took place between 13 June and 25 July 2014, in Netanya, Israel.

Group stage
All kickoff times are of local time in Netanya, Israel (UTC+02:00).

Group A

Group B

Knockout stage

Quarter-finals

Semi-finals

Reglegation playoffs

Final

Winners

Awards

References

Israeli Beach Soccer League seasons
National beach soccer leagues
2014 in beach soccer